The 1984–85 Segunda División was the 36th season of the Mexican Segunda División. The season started on 24 August 1984 and concluded on 23 June 1985. It was won by Irapuato.

Changes 
 Zacatepec was promoted to Primera División.
 Unión de Curtidores was relegated from Primera División.
 Santos Laguna and UAQ were promoted from Segunda División B.
 San Mateo Atenco was promoted from Tercera División.
 La Piedad, UABJ Oaxaca and SUOO were relegated from Segunda División.

During the season
 After Week 8, Veracruz was sold to new owners, the team was relocated at Mérida, Yucatán and renamed as Yucatán.

Teams

Western Zone

Group 1

Group 2

Results

First leg

Second leg

Eastern Zone

Group 3

Group 4

Results

First leg

Second leg

Final stage

Group 1

Group 2

Final

Relegation Group

References 

1984–85 in Mexican football
Segunda División de México seasons